Stanley G. McKie Field at Joseph P. Hayden Jr. Park, commonly referred to as Hayden Park or McKie Field at Hayden Park, is a baseball venue in Oxford, Ohio, United States.  It is home to the Miami RedHawks baseball team, who play at the Division I level of the National Collegiate Athletic Association (NCAA) as members of the Mid-American Conference (MAC).  The field, with a capacity of 1,000 spectators, opened on March 24, 2002, for a game against Purdue.  The RedHawks lost 8–0 in the game, which was played in front of 1,178 spectators.

In 2012, college baseball writer Eric Sorenson ranked the park the best small venue in Division I baseball.

Features 
The facility includes dugouts, indoor batting cages, bullpens, a press box, a picnic area, and a luxury suite and room.  The press box is officially known as the Dave Young Press Box and the luxury room as the Smokey Alston Luxury Room.  The electronic scoreboard in left center field features a radar gun (added in 2004) and a message board.

See also
 List of NCAA Division I baseball venues

References

External links
Stanley G. McKie Field at Joseph P. Hayden Jr. Park photo gallery at muredhawks.com

College baseball venues in the United States
Baseball venues in Ohio
Buildings and structures of Miami University
Miami RedHawks baseball
2002 establishments in Ohio
Sports venues completed in 2002